Wynn or wyn (also spelled wen, ƿynn, and ƿen) is a letter of the Old English alphabet, where it is used to represent the sound .

History

The letter "W" 
While the earliest Old English texts represent this phoneme with the digraph , scribes soon borrowed the rune wynn  for this purpose. It remained a standard letter throughout the Anglo-Saxon era, eventually falling out of use during the Middle English period, circa 1300.

Meaning 
The denotation of the rune is "joy, bliss" known from the Anglo-Saxon Rune Poems:

Miscellaneous 
It is not continued in the Younger Futhark, but in the Gothic alphabet the letter  w is called , allowing a Proto-Germanic reconstruction of the rune's name as *wunjô "joy".

It is one of the two runes (along with þ) to have been borrowed into the English alphabet (or any extension of the Latin alphabet).

As with þ, the letter wynn was revived in modern times for the printing of Old English texts, but since the early 20th century the usual practice has been to substitute the modern .

Wynn in Unicode 

The following wynn and wynn-related characters are in Unicode:

Computing codes

References

See also
 Digamma
 Eth
 Meldorf fibula
 Thorn (letter)
 Vend (letter)
 Yogh
 Ỽ

Wynn
Runes
Latin-script letters
Wynn
Runology